Giovanni Mercurio de Vipera (died 26 May 1527) was a Roman Catholic prelate who served as Bishop of Bagnoregio (1523–1527).

Biography
On 23 March 1523, Giovanni Mercurio de Vipera was appointed during the papacy of Pope Adrian VI as Bishop of Bagnoregio.
He served as Bishop of Bagnoregio until his death on 26 May 1527.

References

External links and additional sources
 (for Chronology of Bishops) 
 (for Chronology of Bishops) 

16th-century Italian Roman Catholic bishops
1527 deaths
Bishops appointed by Pope Adrian VI